Mugaiyalur Sirukarunthumbiyar, also known in full as Sonaattu Mugaiyalur Sirukarunthumbiyar, was a poet of the Sangam period, to whom two verses of Sangam literature have been attributed, in addition to verse 17 of the Tiruvalluva Maalai.

Biography
Sirukarunthumbiyar lived in the town of Mugaiyalur. He has composed poetry on Vallarkilaan.

Contribution to Sangam literature
Mugaiyalur Sirukarunthumbiyar has composed two verses in the Purananuru (verses 181 and 265) and verse 17 of the Tiruvalluva Maalai.

See also

 Sangam literature
 List of Sangam poets
 Tiruvalluva Maalai

Notes

Tamil philosophy
Tamil poets
Sangam poets
Tiruvalluva Maalai contributors